Jacqueline Morreau (18 October 1929 – 13 July 2016) was an American artist.

Life
She was born into a middle-class Jewish family in Milwaukee, Wisconsin. She was the daughter of Eugene Segall, a furniture dealer, and his wife, Jennie (née Horowitz), a milliner. The family moved to Los Angeles in 1943, and at the age of 14 Morreau attended Chouinard Art Institute; in 1946 she won a scholarship to Jepson Art Institute.  At that time, the school was dominated by returning servicemen taking advantage of the GI Bill; it was overwhelmingly male.  "I was considered a great prodigy. That was very nice, very ego-gratifying.  I worked very hard."

In 1949, she spent a year in France and some time in New York City, returning to Los Angeles where she married; her first child was born in 1951.  Four years later, she left her husband and, with her son, moved to San Francisco, where she studied medical illustration. She qualified in 1958. These two streams in her education – artistic and anatomical – enabled her to ground in observed reality her more abstract themes: identity, desire, memory, power and resistance.

She married Patrick Morreau in 1959 and had three more children.  Of this period of her life, Morreau has written "In 1950s and 60s’ San Francisco, I was doing more printmaking than painting because I did not have a place to paint but I did have an etching press in my garage......There was the Vietnam War and the violence of the civil rights movement in the American South. I couldn't ignore these and my prints reflect my anger and horror.  The etchings I made at that time prepared the way for the political triptychs I did later: The Children's Crusade, Lessons of History, and the Gulf War triptych.

In 1967, the family moved to Massachusetts where Morreau found a studio and started painting again, while continuing to develop her printmaking.  She exhibited and gained some recognition for her work.  When, in 1972, her husband was offered a job in London, she and their children moved with him. She soon began to exhibit, and produced portfolios of prints with publishers such as Paupers Press. Her drawings also appeared on book covers from the Women's Press and Bloodaxe Books, and Scarecrow Press in the US.

However, her primary commitment was to the field of fine art and in 1978 she staged Drawn from Life, an exhibition of figurative drawings and prints at the Women's Arts Alliance in London. Galleries at that time were dominated by conceptual art, colourfield painting and electronic media, and both the mainstream art world and the avant garde rejected figuration. Certain factions within feminism also regarded any direct representation of the female body to be retrogressive. In her view, unity was strength and, together with Cate Elwes, Pat Whiteread and Joyce Agee, she spent two years seeking out female artists working with figuration. The result was Women's Images of Men and About Time, two touring exhibitions commencing at the ICA in London in 1980.

Morreau edited the book of the Images of Men show with the critic Sarah Kent, and continued to exhibit with many other female artists, including Sue Coe, Marisa Rueda and Pam Skelton. She promoted female artists in her work as a curator of the Wales Drawing Biennale and as a trustee of the Rootstein Hopkins Foundation. She also influenced generations of students as a visiting lecturer in drawing at the Royal College of Art, London, and Oxford Brookes University, and at Regent's College, London (now Regent's University), where she was a professor of drawing until 1998.  Morreau's vision as an artist is recorded at the British Library's Artists’ Lives archive, and her work is in many private and public collections, including the British Museum, the Arts Council, and the Victoria and Albert Museum.

National Life Stories conducted an oral history interview (C466/135) with Jacqueline Morreau in 2002 for its Artists' Lives collection held by the British Library.

Career

Timeline 
1943–1947 attended Susan Miller Dorsey High School and Chouinard Art Institute Los Angeles; 
1946 began studies with Rico Lebrun at Jepson's Art Institute; 
1947–1949 Los Angeles City College and Jepson's Art Institute; 
1949 travelled to Paris and New York; with photographer Elliott Erwitt
1950–1951 Los Angeles City College and continued studies at Jepson's; worked with ex-Lebrun students at communal workshops;
1953 moved to Berkeley, California; 
1953–1960 worked as research assistant at University of California for various groups, notably with Dr. Ellsworth, C. Doughery, and Dr. Timothy Leary; 
1955–1958 University of California Medical School, San Francisco, received a diploma in medical illustration; 
1959–1967 post-graduate studies in etching with Kathan Brown at Berkeley, and Gordon Cook at San Francisco Art Institute; 
1967 moved to Massachusetts; 
1969 lithography studies with Herb Fox, Boston; 
1972 moved to London; 
1989 Theatre Design, Royal Academy of Dramatic Arts, London; 
1989–1995 visiting lecturer in drawing, Oxford Brookes University and Professor of Art, Regent's College, London;
since 1995 visiting lecturer in drawing, Royal College of Art, London.

Feminist art movement 
Known primarily for her figurative paintings, Jacqueline Morreau's work is often discussed in relation to the feminist art movement. Together with Joyce Agee, Sarah Kent and Pat Whiteread, Morreau organised the touring exhibition 'Women's Images of Men' which opened at the ICA in 1980 and went on to tour across Britain at a number of Galleries including the Arnolfini. Morreau and Kent went on to edit and write the accompanying book.

Permanent collections  
 British Museum
 Victoria and Albert Museum
 Tate Collections and Archives
 Arts Council
 Ferens Art Gallery, Hull
 New Hall Art Gallery, Cambridge
 Touchstones Gallery, Rochdale, Greater Manchester
 Middlesbrough Institute of Modern Art, mima
Manchester City Art Gallery
Pallaint House Gallery and Museum

Quotes
"We have only a small space of time in which to make our marks on paper and canvas, to effect permanent changes in society before the barbarians once more close in … We must work harder than ever to make what gains we can in the consciousness of civilised people."

Bibliography

Selected exhibitions
Solo exhibitions unless otherwise indicated:

Selected group shows

References

External links
Fateful Women: The Art of Jacqueline Morreau

British feminists
British art critics
1929 births
2016 deaths
Susan Miller Dorsey High School alumni